The South Main and South Elm Streets Historic District in Henderson, Kentucky is a historic district which was listed on the National Register of Historic Places in 1992.

Architects Shopbell & Harris and Benjamin Bosworth Smith designed works in the district.

It includes:
Barret House, separately NRHP-listed in 1977
St. Paul's Episcopal Church (1859), separately NRHP-listed in 1978, "the oldest Henderson church remaining in use by original denomination", which is in a "picturesque Gothic Revival style of stuccoed brick in a cruciform plan; all bays defined by simple stepped buttresses with stone caps and pointed arched windows with stone hood molds; gabled main facade has large pointed arch window topped by second, much larger stone hood mold in low relief and ornamental bracing with a pierced trefoil pattern; 3-stage square tower on northwest corner has Tudor-arched sain entrance, belfry with louvered lancet windows and tall 8-sided spire; 7-bay deep sanctuary has 3 aisles, original pews, exposed walnut beans and large pointed arch framing the chancel; geometrical tripartite window behind altar depicts scenes from life of St. Paul, said to be imported from Holland; parish house added 1881 by extending west transept 5 bays in same style as original; stucco added at unknown date; 2-story wing added to south side of parish house 1958; parish formed 1831 and built first church 1837 at corner Rain and Third; this second building designed by Bishop Benjamin Bosworth Smith, who visited England and is credited with designs of several mid-19th c. Episcopal churches in central KY inspired by a church in Stoke Poges, England; built by William Temperly of Maidson, IN. (NR nomination, OHH)" Also contributing is its "wrought iron fence with panelled posts and lancet pickets."

Henderson County Public Library (1904), S. Main St.; designed "by prolific library architects Shopbell & Harris of Evansville, Indiana, the stone structure features a tall primary level on a full raised basement, an Ionic tetrastyle temple front at the entrance pavilion, tall windows with pedimented hoods, and a low dome on an octagonal drum." The library received funding from Andrew Carnegie as part of the philanthropist's Carnegie library program, but had issues finding a suitable lot in the town. The library was opened to the public on August 1, 1904.  The Library underwent renovations in 2020, with a major expansion to the existing building.

See also
National Register of Historic Places listings in Henderson County, Kentucky

References

National Register of Historic Places in Henderson County, Kentucky
Historic districts on the National Register of Historic Places in Kentucky
Henderson, Kentucky